Morag "Maggie" Pearce (née Kirkland) is a former England women's international footballer. She competed at the 1984 European Competition for Women's Football where England lost against Sweden in the final.

International career

Morag Pearce made her England debut at 15 years old.

Personal life

Pearce has a sister, Heather Kirkland who also played for Southampton Women's F.C..

Honors
 Southampton
 FA Women's Cup: 1974–75, 1975–76, 1977–78, 1978–79

References 

Living people
English women's footballers
England women's international footballers
Women's association football defenders
Southampton Women's F.C. players
Women's association football fullbacks
Year of birth missing (living people)